Oldmachar Academy is situated in Bridge of Don in the north of Aberdeen in an area of private housing. It is a six-year comprehensive, non-denominational school which opened to pupils in August 1982 (April 1983 on its present site). In 2004 it was ranked in the top 50 Secondary Schools in Scotland.

Overview
The school consists of seven blocks built to form an irregular quadrangle, with playing fields to the north of the school. The school buildings have often been a target for vandals, with 140 incidents recorded between 2016 and 2019.

The school receives Primary 7 pupils from the 5 associated Primary schools in its 'Associate Schools Group'. These schools are:
Danestone Primary School
Forehill Primary School
Glashieburn Primary School
Greenbrae Primary School
Middleton Park School

The current head teacher is Joanne Hesford, who took over in 2022 from Judith Mohammed.

The school has a capacity of 1,104 pupils. The school roll has gradually fallen over the years, with figures from Aberdeen City Council listing a roll of 852 in 2012, dropping to 656 in 2018, before being forecast to rise slightly in 2020.

The school has a tradition of promoting healthy eating among its pupils, including limiting the amount of fried food available in the canteen. The then-Rector Joseph Leiper took part in a Scotland-wide inquiry into healthy eating in schools in 2004. He was made an OBE for services to education in that year's New Year's Honours list.

Houses
As of 2009, there are seven classes in each year group (A to G) except S1 which has six classes. 
There are four school houses, each named after a local Scottish castle beginning with the letter of the six corresponding classes. "G" does not have its own house due to there not being enough pupils and the absence of a first year "G" class, so they are split into the other houses by year.

The houses are:
Auchindoun (1A–6A)
Crathes (1C–6C)
Esslemont (1E–6E)
Fyvie (1F–6F)

Head teachers

Notable former pupils
Scott Booth, footballer
Neil Fachie, cyclist
Norman Macleod, journalist and news presenter (attended Oldmachar for two years)
Scott Michie, footballer
Gavin Rae, footballer
Dennis Wyness, footballer

External links
Oldmachar Academy website
Oldmachar Academy at Scottish Schools Online

Secondary schools in Aberdeen
Educational institutions established in 1982
1982 establishments in Scotland